The broaden-and-build theory in positive psychology suggests that positive emotions (such as happiness, and perhaps interest and anticipation) broaden one's awareness and encourage novel, exploratory thoughts and actions. Over time, this broadened behavioral repertoire builds useful skills and psychological resources. The theory was developed by Barbara Fredrickson around 1998.

Positive emotions have no immediate survival value, because they take one's mind off immediate needs and stressors. However, the skills that broadened behavior strengthens over time enhance survival. For example, curiosity about a landscape becomes navigational knowledge, pleasant interactions with a stranger become a supportive friendship, and aimless physical play becomes valuable exercise. According to Fredrickson, the resources gained through positive emotions outlive the emotions from which they were acquired. Resources build up over time and increase the individual's overall well-being. This forms a positive cycle: increased well-being leads to more positive emotions which lead to higher resilience, which leads to increased well-being. Happiness, then,  is not only the result of success and high-functioning behavior, but also a precondition for it.

This is in contrast to negative emotions, which prompt narrow, survival-oriented behaviors. For example, anxiety leads to the specific fight-or-flight response. A limited number of urges, called specific action tendencies, quickens response times.

Later development 
Fredrickson's original broaden-and-build theory focused solely how positive emotions broaden one's attention. Later theorists give more weight to the importance of psychological narrowing in addition to broadening when building personal resources. Narrowing is typically associated with negative emotions, but their adverse effects can be counterbalanced by positive emotions. Therefore, the beneficial aspects of narrowing can be experience without harmful effects if both positive and negative emotions are experienced in proportion.

The creative process is often studied in relation to this, as it involves a widening of the mind, building of personal resources, and both sides of the emotional spectrum.

A 2005 study found that naturally creative people experience wider mood swings, spending a lot of time in both positive and negative emotional spaces depending on what they are trying to accomplish at the time. Too much time on either side can be detrimental: excessive positive emotions without an appropriate counterbalance can make people aloof and unfocused.

The creative process is often discussed in two stages: defocused attention, followed by focused attention.

Defocused attention occurs when a person is able to see a wide range of possibilities and take in as much information as possible. Focused attention takes place when more negative emotions are felt and causes people to analyze the possibilities they found during defocused attention. Without this process, concrete ideas do not form.

The whole-brain hypothesis of creativity also promotes the importance of psychological narrowing. The theory states that the defocused stage uses a greater portion of the right side of the brain, whereas the focused process uses more of the left side.  Creativity necessitates communication between the two hemispheres to form coherent theories and develop personal skills.

Support 
Fredrickson has conducted randomized controlled lab studies in which participants are randomly assigned to watch films that induce positive emotions such as amusement and contentment, negative emotions such as fear and sadness, or no emotions. Participants who experience positive emotions show heightened creativity, inventiveness, and "big picture" perceptual focus. Longitudinal intervention studies show that positive emotions help develop long-term resources such as psychological resilience and flourishing. Positive emotions do not just signify current thriving: they can also create broader thought-action repertoires, which lead to increased resources and more satisfied lives.

Meditation and the hedonic treadmill 
A 2008 study found that meditation, and more specifically loving-kindness meditation, can help generate the positive emotions needed to build personal resources. In this type of meditation, a participant first considers a person they already think of in a 'warm' way. They then expand their focus and positive feelings first to themselves, then to a widening array of people.

The hedonic treadmill theory argues that positive emotions are always temporary, and that people must constantly search for new ways to experience positivity as old techniques become ineffective.

The study was performed over a nine-week period, which let researchers see that loving-kindness meditation did not develop positive emotions immediately, but over time. The slow progression provided evidence that the positive effects built resources that allowed for more positive experience in the future. A broaden-and-build approach to positive emotions sidesteps this: positive emotions do not directly contribute to life satisfaction (and as a result lose their effectiveness over time), but instead build beneficial psychological resources which can be drawn upon for extended periods of time.

Writing about positive emotions 
A 2004 study found that writing about intensely positive experiences improved subjects' happiness and health.

For twenty minutes per day over three days, subjects wrote about an intensely positive experience while a control group wrote about a neutral topic. The experimental group demonstrated increased happiness compared to the control. The experimental group also visited the doctor's office far less often than the control group over the following three months.  Subjects who wrote about positive experiences were able to relive past positive emotions, and use them to broaden their experiences and build relationships and skills.

Religions 
According to a 2002 study, people who participate in certain religious practices enjoy benefits similar to those from experiencing positive emotions. Certain religious practices are beneficial because they are "built on a belief of greater meaning in life".  As a result, people are able to find meaning in anything from chance occurrences, such as running into an old friend in the store, to extreme hardships, such as losing a spouse. This belief in greater meaning helps cultivate positive emotions, which led to greater resilience, creativity, wisdom, virtue, physical health and social integration.

Criticism 
A 2010 study by Gable and Harmon-Jones found that exposing subjects to certain negative emotions increased the breadth of their attention, rather than decreasing it. This gave credence to the motivational dimensional model:According to this model, some positive emotions are low in approach motivation, like contentment.  That is, they do not compel individuals to initiate some behavior or act immediately.  These positive emotions, consistent with broaden and build theory, broaden attention.  In this state, individuals attend to many objects or to abstract concepts.

In contrast, other positive emotions, like excitement, are high in approach motivation.  These emotions compel individuals to initiate some act.  These positive emotions, contrary to broaden and build theory, narrow attention.  Presumably, as individuals approach an object, they have evolved to disregard irrelevant distracters.Prior studies by the researchers found similar results: participants who watched films about desirable desserts faced narrowed attention, and a 2009 neurophysiological study found that activation of the left prefrontal cortex is associated with both approach motivation and psychological narrowing.

However, the validity of the motivational dimensional model has recently been seriously challenged due to a overwhelming degree of overlap with valence (questioning whether it is a distinct concept at all) and confounded operationalisations in the literature.

See also
Subjective well-being
Writing therapy

References

Positive psychology